Vainotiškiai (formerly ) is a village in Kėdainiai district municipality, in Kaunas County, in central Lithuania. According to the 2011 census, the village has a population of 909 people. It is located nearby Akademija, between Akademija pond (the Dotnuvėlė river) and the Kačupys river. 

There is ancient burial ground.

Demography

References

Villages in Kaunas County
Kėdainiai District Municipality